Congressional districts, also known as electoral districts and legislative districts, electorates, or wards in other nations, are divisions of a larger administrative region that represent the population of a region in the larger congressional body. Notably, Australia's districts are referred to as electorates or seats; in Canada, these are called "constituencies", or more informally "ridings". Countries with congressional districts include the United States, the Philippines, and Japan.

Terminology
Terminology for congressional districts vary by nations. The term "congressional district" is largely used in the United States and is distinctive from legislative districts. In the United States, congressional districts were inscribed into the Constitution to ensure representation based on population.  Conversely, state legislation declares that "legislative representation be (built open) non-population related principles such as representation of counties, cities, or other geographical and political unit".

Apportionment and delimitation

Apportionment
Apportionment is the process by which seats in a congressional body are allocated amongst constituencies entitled to representation such that each district receives seats in proportion to its population. Apportionment aims to fairly represent all voters through a principle of proportionality; however this is often difficult as proportions can be fractions whilst seats cannot be, and governments may be unable to quantify the precise number of actual voters.

Delimitation
Delimitation or redistricting is the process of drawing congressional boundaries and can also refer to the demarcation of voting areas for the purpose of assigning voters to polling places. Delimiting is a common process in nations with First Past the Post Systems, Two Round Systems, Alternative Vote, Block Vote, Parallel and Mixed Member Proportional Systems and Single-member districts. Nations without these processes typically have proportional representation electoral systems, such as Chile, Honduras, Norway, Spain, and many others.  The methodological framework that governs these processes is integral in administering fair and sovereign judicial systems for nations with delimitation processes.  Manipulation of this framework often results in gerrymandering, the practice of drawing district boundaries to achieve political advantage for legislators.

Japan

Philippines

There are currently 243 congressional districts in the Philippines. Voting representatives are elected from these districts to the lower house of the Congress of the Philippines every three years. In 1946 there were originally 98 congressional districts, this number increased to 200 after the 1987 constitution was created and new redistricting articles were mandated

Apportionment in the Philippines 
The Philippines constitution mandates a nationwide reapportionment of setting boundaries for legislative districts; however, the legislature has not approved a reapportionment bill since 1987. Following the ‘one person, one vote’ doctrine, political territories are expected to be symmetric and have limited variance in the size of its constituencies.  However, many new districts have been created that defy the basic requisites for redistricting as the constitution fails to clearly expound the due process for apportionment and redistricting. This has resulted in unequal representation in districts such as Calacoon City, and Batanes being represented by one legislator each, despite containing populations of 1.2 million and 17 000 people respectively.   

Philippine's 243 congressional districts are composed of territories within provinces, cities and municipalities. From an American perspective, provinces are equivalent to states, and below that is the city/municipality which is equivalent to a city/town in the United States. Provinces are represented by governors and can be split into multiple congressional districts, each of which elects a congressman. Provincial governors allocate resources and control patronage in municipalities across all congressional districts in the province, thus have greater exposure and power than a representative from a single district.

Delimitation in the Philippines

There has been no official delimitation process in the Philippines since the 1987 constitution's ratification. As per Article 6 of the constitution, the requisites for creation of a legislative district are as follows:
Should comprise territories that are practicably contiguous, compact and adjacent.
Contiguous territory of at least 2,000 square kilometres, as certified by the Lands Management Bureau.
A population of at least 250,0000 inhabitants as certified by the National Statistics office. 
Since 1987, 43 districts have been newly added due to the creation of new cities and provinces, sundering from existing provinces, and piecemeal redistricting. As incumbents control the institutions that determine the rules for redistricting, many of the congressional districts are allegedly gerrymandered to ensure the elite persistence of select families that form the Philippines' political dynasties.  This is illustrated by the Marcos family which remained in power from 1987 to 2008 in almost 50 congressional districts, despite term limits.

United States

Congressional districts are the 435 regions from which voting representatives are elected to the U.S. House of Representatives. After the decennial census population counts and apportionment of congressional seats, states are required to define and delineate their own congressional districts for the purpose of electing members to the House of Representatives. Each congressional district is expected to be equal in population to all other congressional districts in a state.  The boundaries and numbers shown for the congressional districts are established by their respective state's constitution or court orders in the apportionment and redistricting cycle.

Apportionment

Apportionment in the United States involves dividing the 435 voting seats every ten years. As per Article One of the United States Constitution, elections to the House of Representatives are held every two years, and the numbers of delegates are apportioned amongst the states according to their relative populations. The Constitution itself makes no mention of districts. 

The U.S. Constitution does not specify how apportionment is to be conducted and multiple methods have been developed and utilized since the Article's inception such as the Jefferson, Hamilton and Webster method. The Jefferson method was first utilized in 1792 after the first decennial census was conducted in 1790 but was abandoned in 1840 as it favoured larger states such as Virginia, Thomas Jefferson's home state and the most influential state at the time.  Hamilton's method was used intermittently for the next half-century and was eventually replaced by Webster's as the Hamilton method resulted in population paradoxes when the House size increased.  After the House size and number of congressional districts were fixed in 1941, the Huntington-Hill method became the official method of apportionment and will be used in the upcoming 2020 apportionment and redistricting cycle. The current method solves many of the issues concerning previous methods, however it still violates the 'one person, one vote' rule established in Wesberry v. Sanders (1964) due to systematic bias which gives more representation and power to small states than to residents of large states.

These methods have been the subject of debate for over 200 years as losing or gaining a seat affects representation which is the source of political power. Congressional districts are subject to the Equal Protection Clause and it is expected that they apportion congressional districts closer to mathematical equality than state legislative districts. The U.S Supreme Court in Karcher v. Daggett (1983) rejected New Jersey's congressional redistricting plans due to a deviation of less than 1%.

Delimitation 
Many other nations assign independent bodies to oversee and mandate the delimitation of boundaries, however, in some nations the legislature manages this process. In the United States, legislature play a commanding role in the redistricting (as delimitation is referred to in the United States) of congressional districts. The redrawing of boundaries occurs after the decennial census; single-member constituencies are responsible for the election of the legislators that govern this process. In 25 states the state legislature is responsible for creating the redistricting plan, however six states (Alaska, Delaware, North Dakota, South Dakota, Vermont and Wyoming) do not require redistricting for the House of Representatives and instead they elect a single representative who will represent the entire state.  Each state has its own constitution and laws surrounding the redistricting process and most of the modern criteria applied federally have come about through rulings by the U.S. Supreme Court.

Prior to 1962, there was limited federal and state government regulation on redistricting and these were rarely enforced. However, after the Baker v. Carr (1962) decision redistricting became justiciable and courts became an active participant in the redistricting process of congressional districts as the decision allowed voters to challenge redistricting plans. Since Shaw v. Reno (1993) and Abrams v. Johnson (1997), the courts have invalidated numerous congressional redistricting plans upon the basis of traditional districting principles. These decisions have been surrounded in controversy as the Supreme Court has not identified these 'traditional' criteria explicitly, resulting in the major political parties attempting to abuse the lack of legislation and definition to advantage their respective parties. According to the database of redistricting laws in all fifty states and previous court decisions, the de facto principles are: compactness, contiguity, equal population, and preserving county and city boundaries.

See also
Electoral district
List of electoral districts by nation
House of Representatives (Japan)
House of Representatives of the Philippines
United States House of Representatives

References

Legislatures
Types of administrative division